The men's coxless four competition at the 2016 Summer Olympics in Rio de Janeiro was held from 8 to 12 August at the Lagoon Rodrigo de Freitas.

The medals for the competition were presented by Sir Craig Reedie, Great Britain, member of the International Olympic Committee, and the gifts were presented by Mike Tanner, Hong Kong, Member of the Executive Committee of the International Rowing Federation.

Results

Heats
First three of each heat qualify to semifinal, remainder goes to the repechage.

Heat 1

Heat 2

Heat 3

Repechage
First three of  heat qualify to semifinal.

Semifinals A/B 
First three of each heat qualify to the Final A, remainder goes to the Final B.

Semifinals A/B 1

Semifinals A/B 2

Finals

Final B

Final A

References

Men's coxless four
Men's events at the 2016 Summer Olympics